Srobbine, Surubbin,  is a village in the  Bint Jbeil District in southern Lebanon.

Name
According to E. H. Palmer,  Surubbin comes from a personal name.

History
In 1852, Edward Robinson noted the village (Seribbin) on his travels in the region.

In 1881, the PEF's Survey of Western Palestine (SWP) described it as: "a small stone village, containing about eighty Metawileh, situated on hill-top, with olives and arable cultivation ; springs near, and cisterns and birket."

References

Bibliography

External links
 Srobbine, Localiban
Survey of Western Palestine, Map 4: IAA, Wikimedia commons

Populated places in Bint Jbeil District
Shia Muslim communities in Lebanon